Mihail Andricu (22 December 1894, Bucharest - 4 March 1974, Bucharest ) was a Romanian composer, violinist, and pianist. He studied with Alfonso Castaldi, Robert Klenck and Dumitru Kiriac. Andricu graduated from the National University of Music Bucharest (1903 to 1912), after which he studied with Gabriel Fauré (1913-1914) and Vincent d'Indy in Paris (1919-1922). From 1926 to 1948 he was a professor of chamber music and from 1948 to 1959 he was a professor of composition. 

A co-founder of the Society of Romanian Composers, he was elected as a corresponding member of the Romanian Academy in 1948, member of the Société française de musicologie, and twice winner of the Enescu Prize, though his work was later suppressed by the government. Censor Leonte Răutu castigated Andricu for admitting or showing an appreciation for contemporary Western classical music. Andricu was expelled from the composers' union in 1959 and his mention was prohibited.

Highly prolific, Andricu composed eleven symphonies, thirteen sinfoniettas, and three chamber symphonies. Specific pieces include a symphonic suite: Cinderella.

Honors
Enescu Prize for composition (Op. 1) in 1923
Enescu Prize for composition (Op. 2) in 1924
Robert Cremer Prize in 1931
Anhauch Prize in 1932
Romanian Academy Award in 1949

References

1894 births
1974 deaths
Musicians from Bucharest
Corresponding members of the Romanian Academy
Romanian classical composers
Enescu Prize winners